According to the Ministry of Commerce and Industry, the fifteen largest trading partners of India represent 59.37% of total trade by India in the financial year 2019-2020. These figures include trade in goods and commodities, but do not include services or foreign direct investment.

The two largest goods traded by India are mineral fuels (refined / unrefined) and gold (finished gold ware / gold metal). In the year 2013–14, mineral fuels (HS code 27) were the largest traded item with 181.383 billion US$ worth imports and 64.685 billion US$ worth re-exports after refining. In the year 2013–14, gold and its finished items (HS code 71) were the second largest traded items with 58.465 billion US$ worth imports and 41.692 billion US$ worth re-exports after value addition. These two goods are constituting 53% total imports, 34% total exports and nearly 100% of total trade deficit (136 billion US$) of India in the financial year 2013–14. The services trade (exports and imports) are not part of commodities trade. The trade surplus in services  trade is US$70 billion in the year 2017–18.

Counting the European Union as one, the WTO ranks India fifth for commercial services exports and sixth for commercial services imports.

The two main destinations of exported Indian merchandises is the EU market and the US, when the two main markets of origin are China and the EU
According to the Ministry of Commerce and Industry, the fifteen largest trading partners of India represent 59.37% of total trade by India in the financial year 2015–2016. These figures include trade in goods and commodities, but do not include services or foreign direct investment.

Largest trading partners with India
(Financial Year 2021–22) in US Billion dollars

India exported about $422 billion merchandise in the financial year 2021-2022 and about $250 billion of services exports in the same financial year. India's largest trade partners with their total trade (sum of imports and exports) in billions of US dollars for the financial year 2021–22 were as follows:

Countries to which India is the largest trading partner
India is the primary export or import partner of several countries. The percentages on these tables are based on 2017 data as shown on the CIA World Factbook.

Export partners
India exports approximately 7500 commodities to about 192 countries. The following table shows India's 10 largest destinations for exports in 2019–2020.

Import partners
India imports around 6000 commodities from 140 countries. The following table shows India's 10 largest sources of imports in 2019–2020.

See also
 India related
 Foreign trade of India
 Economy of India
 Foreign-exchange reserves of India
 Remittances to India 
 Business process outsourcing to India
 List of exports of India
 Indian diaspora
 Indianisation

 Lists
 List of countries by leading trade partners
 List of the largest trading partners of the ASEAN
 List of the largest trading partners of the United States
 List of the largest trading partners of the European Union
 List of the largest trading partners of China
 List of the largest trading partners of Australia
 List of the largest trading partners of Canada

References

Trading partners
Foreign trade of India
Economy-related lists of superlatives
Indian superlatives
Lists of trading partners